Odds On is a 1928 Australian silent film starring Arthur Tauchert set in the world of horse racing. It was the first film as director from noted cinematographer Arthur Higgins.

It is considered a lost film.

Plot
Sydney Baxter, a jockey, tries to shield a friend by allowing himself to be suspended for six months for improper riding. He joins up with racecourse urger Grafter Jones and sets of to tour country race meetings. Baxter goes to work in the stables of a family friend, John Grayson, and falls in love with his daughter, Betty. Grayson gives Baxter the chance to ride his horse, Brigade, in a local derby and Baxter is victorious.

Cast
Arthur Tauchert as Grafter Jones
Phyllis Gibbs as Betty Grayson
Check Hayes as Sydney Baxter
Stella Southern
Stanley Court
Robert Purdie
John Faulkner
Violet Elliot as the cook
W.H. McLachlan
Gayne Threlkeld

Production
The female lead, Phyllis Gibbs, had been under contract to Cecil B. de Mille in Hollywood.

The movie was shot in June 1928 on location at Randwick racecourse and in Australasian Films' Bondi studio. A number of well known race horses and jockeys appear.

Release
The movie obtained a release in the UK as a quota picture.

References

External links

Odds On at National Film and Sound Archive

1928 films
Australian drama films
Australian silent feature films
Australian black-and-white films
1928 drama films
Lost Australian films
1928 lost films
Lost drama films
Silent drama films